Vinia A. Mojica (born March 14, 1970) is a singer-songwriter from Queens, New York City, United States of America. She is best known for her collaborations with the Native Tongues collective and other hip hop artists.

Life and career
Her recording career began in 1989 with the song "Acknowledge Your Own History", from the Jungle Brothers' 1989 album Done By the Forces of Nature. It would be the beginning of her association with the Native Tongues Posse – which would produce De La Soul's 1991 hit "A Roller Skating Jam Named "Saturdays"" – and continue with A Tribe Called Quest and later with its second generation of Mos Def, Talib Kweli, Hi-Tek and Common.

Mojica also made numerous appearances on Heavy D's album Nuttin' But Love (1995) and his 1997 single, "Water Bed Hev"; collaborated with French hip hop group Alliance Ethnik in 1995 and 1998; and made guest appearances on albums by Heltah Skeltah, Rahzel, and Pete Rock. Outside of hip hop, she has also recorded and performed with Mary J. Blige, Youssou N'Dour and Arto Lindsay, as well as downtempo artists like Cibo Matto, DJ Spinna, and, in 2005, Jneiro Jarel. In 2002 Mojica collaborated with French hip hop and electro artist DJ Mehdi (credited as Espion) on "Anything Is Possible", a track later remixed by Château Flight.

In 2003, Mojica finally released her debut single, "Guilt Junkie" (with the B-side "Sands of Time").

Discography
Singles
"Magnificent" (2002) (with Mos Def)
"Guilt Junkie" b/w "Sands of Time" (2003)

Guest appearances
A Tribe Called Quest – "Verses from the Abstract" from The Low End Theory (1991)
De La Soul – "A Roller Skating Jam Named 'Saturdays'" from De La Soul is Dead (1991)
Pete Rock & CL Smooth – "Searching" from The Main Ingredient (1994)
Heltah Skeltah – "Therapy" from Nocturnal (1996)
Pete Rock – "Mind Blowin'" from Soul Survivor (1998)
Black Star – "K.O.S. (Determination)" from Mos Def & Talib Kweli Are Black Star (1998)
Mos Def – "Climb" from Black on Both Sides (1999)
Alliance Ethnik – "Honesty & jalousie" from "Honesty et Jalousie (fais un choix dans la vie) (1995)"; "Respect", "Fat Come Back", "Tu Sais Quoi", and "5 Heures Du Mat" from Fat Comeback (1999)
Reflection Eternal – "The Blast" from Train of Thought (2000)
Da Beatminerz – "Take That" from Brace 4 Impak (2001)
Hi-Tek – "The Sun God" and "Get Ta Steppin'" from Hi-Teknology (2001)
Talib Kweli – "Stand to the Side" from Quality (2002)
DJ Mehdi – "Anything Is Possible" from (The Story of) Espion (2002)
Common – "Ferris Wheel" from Electric Circus (2002)
DJ Spinna – "Idols" from Here to There (2003)

References

External links

Vinia Mojica press release on Giant Step Records

1970 births
American hip hop singers
Living people
American rhythm and blues singer-songwriters
American women singer-songwriters
People from Queens, New York
Singers from New York City
Singer-songwriters from New York (state)
21st-century American women